Zinc finger protein 629 is a protein that in humans is encoded by the ZNF629 gene.

References

Further reading